Runoff, run-off or RUNOFF may refer to:
 Runoff (hydrology), the flow of water over land
 Channel runoff, the confined flow of water
 Surface runoff, the unconfined flow of water over land
 Runoff model (reservoir), a mathematical model involving rainfall and runoff
 Runoff curve number, an empirical parameter used in hydrology
 RUNOFF, the first computer text-formatting program
 Runoff or run-off, another name for bleed, printing that lies beyond the edges to which a printed sheet is trimmed
 Runoff or run-off, a stock market term
 Runoff voting system, also known as the two-round system, a voting system where a second round of voting is used to elect one of the two candidates receiving the most votes in the first round
 Instant-runoff voting, an extension or variation of runoff voting where a second round can be rendered unnecessary by voters ranking candidates in order of preference
 Run-off area, a racetrack safety feature
 Runoff (2014 film) directed by Kimberly Levin

See also 
 Runoff voting (disambiguation)
 All pages with titles containing "runoff", "run-off" or "run off"